Mercer County Technical Schools (MCTS), also known as the Area Vocational Technical Schools of Mercer County, is a countywide vocational public school district based in Trenton and Pennington. Serving the high school-aged population of Mercer County, New Jersey, United States. The district's programs are offered on a shared-time basis whereby a student is enrolled in their home school for academic and other educational activities and then attends a technical school on a half-day basis. The district also offers full-time academies for those in high school that caters to specific academic areas of study.

The superintendent for the district is also the superintendent for the Mercer County Special Services School District.

Full-time schools
Schools in the district (with 2020-21 enrollment data from the National Center for Education Statistics) are:

Administration
Core members of the district's administration are:
 Mr. Matthew C. Carey, Superintendent
 Dr. Charles Powell, Assistant Superintendent for Curriculum and Instruction
 Ms. Deborah Donnelly, School Business Administrator
 Ms. Lisa Flynn, Assistant School Business Administrator
 Mr. Michael Orfe, Director of Vocational Education
 Mr. Alan Munford, Principal Assunpink Center
 Mr. Jared Warren, Principal Sypek Center
 Ms. Susan Conrad, Assistant Principal Assunpink Center
 Mr. Eric Palm, Assistant Principal Sypek Center
 Mr. Ryan Haimer, Principal Adult Evening Programs

References

External links 
 
 
 School Data for the Mercer County Technical Schools, National Center for Education Statistics

School districts in Mercer County, New Jersey
Trenton, New Jersey
Vocational school districts in New Jersey